Marisol Ribeiro (stage name Marisol Ribeiro Ferreira, July 19, 1984 in São Paulo) is a Brazilian actress.

Biography 

Daughter of actress Maria Ferreira and former television news presenter Gilberto Ribeiro, For many years she lived in Taubaté in São Paulo. In 1999 she moved to the capital seeking the dream of becoming an actress. She participated in many TV commercials, soap operas and a few pieces. In 2001 she joined the cast of Disney Cruj in SBT, then immediately took Marisol, the same station, and the same year (2002) also did Malhação on Rede Globo, interpreting Tininha.

In 2006, Marisol interpret Manuela in Malhação, but was replaced by Luiza Valdetaro, who had also played América and, curiously, a character of the same name.

Once posed nude for the magazine Sexy in 2005. The following year, after leaving the Rede Globo, Marisol accused the broadcaster does not give her more work in soap operas and series for having posed nude in the magazine, claiming to have suffered an increasing devaluation of the network as a result.

Filmography

Television

Films

Theater

References

External links 

1984 births
Living people
Actresses from São Paulo
Brazilian television actresses
Brazilian telenovela actresses
Brazilian film actresses
Brazilian stage actresses